is a Japanese actress and former AV idol.

Life and career
After beginning her career as a gravure idol, which included modeling for Akira Gomi, Murakami made her adult video (AV) debut in the March 1988 h.m.p. Miss Christine release, . In December of her debut year she also had a role in Toei's mainstream drama release, .

In addition to continuing her AV career, Murakami had another role in a mainstream drama, appearing in Bandai Visual's  in March 1990. Also in 1990 she appeared in pioneering pink film director/producer Kan Mukai's . She also had roles in a number of V-Cinema films.

Her work became popular in Hong Kong, and led to her getting roles in several Category III films of Hong Kong cinema, starting around 1991. Her most significant film there was the 1991 cult favorite, Sex and Zen. In a review of the DVD release of Sex and Zen, a reviewer described her as one of "Asian cinema's most beautiful actresses". Her last film in Hong Kong, 1/3 Lover, was released in 1993.

There was a minor scandal when news leaked that she might have had sex with the Sultan of Brunei during his visit to Japan in 1993. For several years starting in the late 1990s, she toured various strip theaters around Japan, such as the famous Asakusa Rokku-za (ロック座).

In 1997, she produced and starred in the pink film , through Runa Films. The film was distributed theatrically by XCes, scripted by pink film actress Kiyomi Itō, and directed by Satoru Kobayashi, director of the first pink film, Flesh Market (1962).

Later, Murakami had a small part in the 2008 Japanese comedy, Serial Dad.

Since 2018, Rena Murakami has been a radio personality on a talk radio program in Osaka.

Partial filmography

Adult Videos (AV)

Hong Kong films

Japanese V-cinema and films

Magazine appearances
 Goro
 November 24, 1988 (#23, nude, with Reiko Hayama)
 December 8, 1988 (#24, nude)
 Heibon Punch
 May 5, 1988 (4 p., nude)
 Weekly Playboy
 1988
 April 5, 1988 (5 p., nude)
 July 19, 1988 (3 p., swimming suit)
 September 20, 1988 (4p., nude)
 1989
 March 21, 1989 (6 p., nude)
 August 15, 1989 (7 p., nude)
 1992
 November 24, 1992 (nude)

Bibliography

English

Japanese

Notes

External links
 unofficial fan page to Rena Murakami (in Japanese only)
 
 

1967 births
Japanese female erotic dancers
Japanese female adult models
Japanese gravure models
Japanese film actresses
Japanese pornographic film actresses
Pink film actors
Hong Kong film actresses
Actresses from Tokyo
Living people